Jack Howard (born July 21, 1981 in Weno, Chuuk Atoll) is a track and field sprint athlete who competes internationally for the Federated States of Micronesia.

Howard represented the Federated States of Micronesia at the 2008 Summer Olympics in Beijing. He competed at the 100 metres sprint and placed 7th in his heat without advancing to the second round. He ran the distance in a time of 11.03 seconds.

His brother John Howard competed at the 2012 Summer Olympics.

Achievements

References

External links
 

1981 births
Living people
People from Chuuk State
Federated States of Micronesia male sprinters
Olympic track and field athletes of the Federated States of Micronesia
Athletes (track and field) at the 2008 Summer Olympics